Čeradice is a municipality and village in Louny District in the Ústí nad Labem Region of the Czech Republic. It has about 300 inhabitants.

Administrative parts
Villages of Kličín and Větrušice are administrative parts of Čeradice.

References

Villages in Louny District